Vincent Leo Molyneaux (August 17, 1888 – May 4, 1950) was a relief pitcher in Major League Baseball who played for the St. Louis Browns and Boston Red Sox. Listed at 6' 0", 180 lb., Molyneaux batted and threw right-handed. A native of Lewiston, New York, he attended Niagara University and Villanova University.
 
In his career, Molyneaux posted a 1–0 record with a 4.41 ERA in 13 games, including five strikeouts, 28 walks, 21 hits allowed, and  innings of work without a save.

Molyneaux died at the age of 61 in Stamford, Connecticut.

Fact
Was a member of the 1918 American League champions Red Sox, although he did not play in the World Series.

References

External links
Baseball Reference
Retrosheet

1888 births
1950 deaths
Boston Red Sox players
St. Louis Browns players
Major League Baseball pitchers
Niagara Purple Eagles baseball players
Villanova Wildcats baseball players
Baseball players from New York (state)
Jamestown Giants players
London Tecumsehs (baseball) players
Salt Lake City Bees players
People from Lewiston, New York